Magnae (Latin for "The Greats") may refer to:

 Magnae Carvetiorum (Carovoran) in northern Britain
 Magnae Dobunnorum (Kenchester) in southwestern Britain